There are at least 3 named mountains in Treasure County, Montana.
 Bulldog Butte, el. 
 Rattlesnake Butte, el. 
 Whiskey Butte, el.

See also
 List of mountains in Montana
 List of mountain ranges in Montana

Notes

Landforms of Treasure County, Montana
Treasure